Ring Mountain may refer to:

 Ring Mountain (British Columbia) in British Columbia, Canada
 Ring Mountain (California) in California, USA
 Ring Mountain (Texas) in Texas, USA
 Ring Mountain (Wyoming) in Wyoming, USA